
This is a list of the Areas of Special Scientific Interest (ASSIs) in County Armagh in Northern Ireland, United Kingdom.

In Northern Ireland the body responsible for designating ASSIs is the Northern Ireland Environment Agency – a division of the Department of Environment (DoE).

Unlike the SSSIs, ASSIs include both natural environments and man-made structures. As with SSSIs, these sites are designated if they have criteria based on fauna, flora, geological or physiographical features. On top of this, structures are also covered, such as the Whitespots mines in Conlig, according to several criterion including rarity, recorded history and intrinsic appeal.

For other sites in the rest of the United Kingdom, see List of SSSIs by Area of Search.

Data is available from the Northern Ireland Environment Agency's website in the form of citation sheets for each ASSI.

 Brackagh Bog ASSI
 Caledon and Tynan ASSI
 Cam Lough ASSI
 Camlough Quarry ASSI
 Carlingford Lough ASSI
 Carrickastickan ASSI
 Cashel Loughs ASSI
 Cloghinny ASSI
 Crossbane Lough ASSI
 Derryvore ASSI
 Drumcarn ASSI
 Drumlougher Lough ASSI
 Fathom Upper ASSI
 Glendesha ASSI
 Kiltubbrid Loughs ASSI
 Lislea ASSI
 Levallymore ASSI
 Lough Gullion ASSI
 Lough Neagh ASSI
 Loughaveely ASSI
 Lurgan Lough ASSI
 Moyrourkan Lough ASSI
 Mullaghbane ASSI
 Peatlands Park ASSI
 Selshion ASSI
 Slieve Gullion ASSI
 Straghans Lough ASSI
 Tullyard ASSI
 Tullybrick Lough ASSI

References

Areas of Special Scientific Interest in Northern Ireland
Geography of County Armagh
Areas of Special Scientific